Nuria González (born 16 May 1962) is a Spanish actress. She became popular to a television audience for her performances in series such as Manos a la obra, Los Serrano and Física o Química.

Life and career 
Nuria González was born on 16 May 1962 in Málaga. She earned early public recognition to a television audience in Spain by appearing in the late night show  (as the transvestite Ramón) as well as featuring in the series Manos a la obra and Los Serrano. She also featured in the series .

In addition to her acting career, González has worked as a television presenter, hosting the Spain's version of the game show Weakest Link, which she quit in 2002, citing professional issues and physical exhaustion, focusing instead on her work in the theatre play 5mujeres.com, staged at the Teatro Alcázar.

She has been highlighed for deciding to drastically quit her roles in Manos a la obra (Adela) and Los Serrano (Candela), as well as later also Física o Química, at the height of all three popular series. She left Los Serrano in 2006. In 2005, González featured in a supporting role in Chus Gutiérrez's El Calentito, performing the role of Antonia, a trans woman and bar owner. Her work in the film earned her a Best New Performance award at the 8th Málaga Film Festival. She starred in the Icíar Bollaín's film Mataharis (2007) alongside Najwa Nimri and María Vázquez, portraying Carmen, a private investigator. Her performance clinched her a nomination to the Goya Award for Best Supporting Actress. She returned to television, featuring in teen drama series Física o química, portraying the role of Clara (the director of the high school where the fiction took place) from 2008 to 2010. In 2010, she also decided to quit the series to focus on her main acting activity on stage, although she has also featured afterwards in some television works, including her performances in the first season of Señoras del (h)AMPA and in 30 Coins.

Filmography

Television

Film

Accolades

References

External links

1962 births
Living people
People from Málaga
Actresses from Andalusia
Spanish film actresses
Spanish television actresses
Spanish stage actresses
Spanish women television presenters
Spanish women comedians
Spanish stand-up comedians
20th-century Spanish actresses
21st-century Spanish actresses